The Local Initiative Health Authority for Los Angeles County (L.A. Care)  is a public agency that provides health insurance for low-income individuals in Los Angeles County through four health coverage programs including Medi-Cal. 

Launched in 1997,  in March 2022 LA Care was fined $55 million by the California Department of Managed Health Care and the California Department of Health Care Services for "deep-rooted, systemic failures that threaten the health and safety of its members."

Company Description
L.A. Care Health Plan (Local Initiative Health Authority for Los Angeles County) was created by the State of California to provide health care services for Medi-Cal managed care beneficiaries, uninsured children and other vulnerable populations in Los Angeles County.

History and structure
In 1993, the State Department of Health Services produced a report entitled “Expanding Medi-Cal Managed Care: Reforming the Health System – Protecting Vulnerable Populations” which served as a blueprint for expansion of Medi-Cal managed care. It designated L.A. County as one of the areas for the “Two-Plan Model” where a locally organized Medi-Cal managed care plan (local initiative health plan) would be formed to compete directly for Medi-Cal managed care enrollments with a “commercial plan.” After a competitive selection process, Health Net of California was chosen by the State as the “commercial plan,” L.A. Care Health Plan was formed as the Local Initiative Health Authority of Los Angeles County, and the Two-Plan Model began to operate in L.A. County.

During its 1997 launch, L.A. Care contracted with seven established health plans, referred to as plan partners: Blue Cross of California (now Anthem), Community Health Plan (CHP), Kaiser Permanente, Care 1st, UHP, Tower Health Plan and Maxicare. By 2006, L.A. Care had established its own direct line of business in Medi-Cal. L.A. Care currently has three plan partners. They are Anthem Blue Cross, Kaiser Permanente, and Blue Shield of California Promise Health Plan (formerly Care 1st).

In 1998, L.A. Care became involved in the Healthy Families program, California's version of the Children's Health Insurance Plan (CHIP), and then in 2003 launched L.A. Care's Healthy Kids program for children ages 0–5, funded in partnership with First 5 LA and the Children's Health Initiative of Greater Los Angeles. Healthy Kids was established as an insurance program for families who do not qualify for Medi-Cal or Healthy Families due to either income or immigration status. It was expanded to children ages 6–18 in 2004. L.A. Care announced that the Healthy Kids programs would end at the end of 2016 as a result of SB 75 – a California law implemented in May 2016 – which expanded full-scope Medi-Cal benefits to all low-income children regardless of immigration status.

In 2008, L.A. Care launched the Medicare Advantage Special Needs Plan (SNP) for those dually-eligible for both Medi-Cal and Medicare. L.A. Care closed the Medicare SNP on December 31, 2014, as it chose to participate in the Cal MediConnect dual-eligible pilot. In January 2015, L.A. Care began accepting passive enrollment into the Cal MediConnect program. Cal MediConnect offers members a coordinated care model within a single health plan and will help to foster better health outcomes and improved quality of life for dual-eligibles.

On October 1, 2013, L.A. Care Health Plan launched L.A. Care Covered, a new health plan accredited by the NCQA and selected by Covered California to administer health insurance to Los Angeles County residents.

Governance

L.A. Care is governed by a 13-member stakeholder Board of Governors representing consumers, community clinics, physicians, hospitals, federally-qualified health centers, children's health care providers, and the Los Angeles County Department of Health Services. Two of the seats are held by consumers who are elected by L.A. Care enrollees.  L.A. Care is among the few public health plans to have consumer members on its governing board with full voting privileges.

Fifteen consumer advisory committees from across Los Angeles County advise the board of governors.

Community grantmaking

L.A. Care launched its Community Health Investment Fund in 2001. Since then, it has awarded more than $132 million in grants and support for the health care safety net, to improve community and public health and expand health insurance coverage among underserved populations. Grant initiatives include the Tranquada Awards, which provide infrastructure support for safety net clinics, the Oral Health Initiative, which expands access to dental care for low-income Angelenos, and the Health Information Technology Initiative, which helps clinics purchase and implement technologies such as disease registries and electronic health records.

In 2017, L.A. Care announced a $20 million commitment to address homelessness in Los Angeles County. The five-year commitment is with Brilliant Corners, a nonprofit that works with the county's Housing for Health program.

Community Resource Centers

Jointly operated by Blue Shield of California Promise Health Plan and L.A. Care Health Plan, community resource centers offer member support services, enrolment in local and state assistance programs and other community services.
Centers are currently located in Pomona, Lynwood, East Los Angeles and Palmdale. The centers, to total 14, are part of a five-year, $146 million initiative launched by the two health plans in 2019 to expand community health access across Los Angeles County.

L.A. Care Health Plan previously operated Family Resource Centers. They were located in East L.A., Lynwood, Inglewood, Boyle Heights, Pacoima and Palmdale, CA, providing free health education, fitness and nutrition classes to all community members.

Programs

Promotion of Health Information Technology

In April 2010, L.A. Care was awarded a federal grant to establish a Health Information Technology Regional Extension Center (REC), called HITEC-LA, to help doctors in L.A. County adopt and use Electronic Health Records (EHRs).  HITEC-LA is the sole REC in L.A. County, under the terms of the grant. The grant was awarded by the U.S. Department of Health and Human Services through the Health Information Technology for Economic and Clinical Health Act (HITECH Act), of the American Recovery and Reinvestment Act of 2009.

Addressing Physician Shortage

In July 2018, L.A. Care launched Elevating the Safety Net, a long-term initiative to recruit primary care physicians to the Los Angeles County safety net. The L.A. Care Board of Governors committed $31 million for the initiative, which has three programs: medical school scholarships, medical school loan repayments and a recruitment program to help clinics and practices with physician salary subsidies, sign-on bonuses and relocation costs.

In 2021, L.A. Care provided $3.2 million to Charles Drew University of Medicine and Science, White Memorial Medical Center Charitable Foundation, AltaMed Health ServicesCorporation, and the David Geffen School of Medicine at UCLA  in support of 25 residency positions.

See also
 Health care

References

External links
 L.A. Care Website

Companies based in Los Angeles
Medical and health organizations based in California
1997 establishments in California